Kjell Borgen (21 October 1939 – 22 August 1996) was a Norwegian politician for the Labour Party. He served as Minister of Transport and Communications from 1986 to 1988, Minister of Local Government from 1988 to 1989 and again from 1990 to 1992. He served as County Governor of Hedmark from 1993 until his death.

Early life and career
He was born in Oslo as a son of a worker and a housewife. He attended the teacher's college at Elverum from 1960 to 1962. He worked as a secondary school teacher in Rendalen from 1962 to 1966, and also minored in Norwegian at the University of Oslo in 1964. From 1967 to 1972 he worked as headmaster at a combined primary-secondary school, and from 1972 he had a municipal administrative job.

Borgen chaired his regional branch of the Workers' Youth League from 1957 to 1959. He chaired his local Labour Party chapter from 1964 to 1967, and the county chapter from 1976 to 1980. He was a member of the Labour Party central committee from 1985 to 1993. Locally, Borgen became a member of Rendalen municipal council in 1965. In 1967 he became mayor, serving until 1977. He was a member of Hedmark county council from 1967 to 1979, from 1874 to 1975 as deputy county mayor (fylkesvaraordfører).

National politics
In 1977, he was elected to the Parliament of Norway from Hedmark, and he was re-elected in 1981, 1985 and 1989. He served as President of the Lagting from 10 to 18 December 1979. When Prime Minister Gro Harlem Brundtland formed her Second Cabinet in 1986, Borgen became Minister of Transport and Communications. He remained so until 13 June 1988, when he became Norwegian Minister of Local Government and Labour.

According to Tore Lindholt, who released a book about the Norwegian State Railways in 1990, the same year as he served as acting director-general for the second time, Borgen was instrumental in removing Robert Nordén as director-general of the State Railways. Borgen asked Prime Minister Gro Harlem Brundtland to have Nordén removed, and when Brundtland gave the green light, Borgen told this to then-assisting director-general Lindholt over the telephone. Borgen also became slightly controversial due to the Oslo Airport localization debate. A decision to choose Hurum as the site of the new Oslo Airport was the reason for Borgen's withdrawal as Minister of Transport.

Borgen lost his position as Minister of Local Government and Labour when Brundtland's Second Cabinet fell in 1989. When Brundtland's Third Cabinet returned in 1990, Borgen returned as well, only under a slightly different name: Minister of Local Government. He made his exit in September 1992, and sat through his last term in Parliament, to 1993. While Borgen was Minister, his seat in Parliament was taken by Ingrid Nylund and Grethe Fossum.

Borgen finished his career with the position as County Governor of Hedmark from 1993. When Borgen died in August 1996, Ola Skjølaas became Acting County Governor.

References

1939 births
1996 deaths
University of Oslo alumni
Labour Party (Norway) politicians
Mayors of places in Hedmark
Members of the Storting
County governors of Norway
Heads of schools in Norway
Ministers of Transport and Communications of Norway
Ministers of Local Government and Modernisation of Norway
20th-century Norwegian politicians